The Collegium of State Income (Kamer-kollegiya; or Revenue) was a Russian executive body (collegium), created in the government reform of 1717. It was de-established during the decentralising reforms of Catherine II of Russia in 1785, restored 12 years later by her successor Paul I to be finally liquidated in 1801. It was responsible for the management of state fees and some branches of the economy (agriculture, etc.); later, some of its affairs were transferred to other collegia.

Presidents 
 Dmitry Golitsyn (1718–22)
 Gerasim Koshelev (1722)
 Alexey Pleshcheyev (1723–25)
 Alexander Naryshkin (1725–27)
 Dmitry Golitsyn (1727–32)
 Sergey Golitsyn (1732–35)
 Pyotr Melgunov (1735–37)
 Ivan Bibikov (1737–42)
 Grigory Kislovsky (1742–53)
 Mikhail Shakhovskoy (1753–60)
 Ivan Yushkov (1760–62)
 Boris Kurakin (1762–64)
 Alexey Melgunov (1764–77)
 Mikhail Shcherbatov (1778–84)
 Vasily Popov (1797–99)
 Alexey Kozhin (1799–1801)
 Ignaty Theils (1801)

See also 
 Kamer-Kollezhsky rampart in Moscow, named after Kamer-kollegiya.

References 
 
 
 

Collegia of the Russian Empire
1717 establishments in Russia